Marmaroglypha fasciata is a species of beetle in the family Cerambycidae. It was described by Francis Polkinghorne Pascoe in 1869. It is known from Borneo and Malaysia.

References

Lamiini
Beetles described in 1869